Lorenco Boriçi (4 August 1922 – 25 April 1984), commonly known as Loro Boriçi was an Albanian footballer who played as a forward. He is regarded as one of Albania's greatest players.

He played mostly for  Partizan Tirana (won the 1949 and 1954 Albanian title and scored 68 goals for them) and Vllaznia (won the 1945 Albanian title). Boriçi was the reserve of Silvio Piola in Italian Serie A with Lazio. He captained Albania in winning the 1946 Balkan Cup. Today, Loro-Boriçi Stadium in Shkodër is named in his honour.

Club career 
Born Lorenco Boriçi on 4 August 1922 in Shkodër, Albania, Boriçi was pursuing secondary studies in the Xaverian College of his city, and was only 15 when he played as part of the first team of Vllaznia in an August 1937 friendly against Dragoi Pogradec. He went to Italy, and registered at La Sapienza University, Rome, to pursue Jurisprudence studies, and in 1941, became part of the SS Lazio team, where he played in the first year with the reserves, and in the second year he was part of the first team, with which he scored 6 goals in 19 matches. Upon his return to Albania he captained Vllaznia to two titles, the 1945, and the 1946 ones, after which, in 1949, at the age of 27, he joined KF Partizani. With Partizani Boriçi won the 1949 and 1954 titles. He closed his career at KF Spartaku Tiranë, but it is believed that he may have played some games also with Flamurtari Vlorë.

International career 
Boriçi made his debut for the Albania national team in an August 1946 friendly match against Montenegro and earned a total of 24 caps, scoring 6 goals. His final international was a September 1957 friendly match against China. Boriçi captained Albania in winning the Balkan Cup in 1946.

Managerial career 
Boriçi became then manager at KF Partizani, a team which he led to winning the 1962–63, the 1963–64, and the 1970–71 titles, in addition he led also the 1963–64, the 1965–66, the 1967–68, and the 1969–70 Albanian Cups.

Aside Partizani, he managed the Albania national team in five separate stints.

Personal life 
Boriçi never married, but it was believed that he had fathered a son with a married woman. KF Tirana fans during the derbies against FK Partizani Tirana, would usually sing the name of his natural son, in order to make him nervous, which usually succeeded.

Honours 
 Albanian Superliga
as a player: 3
 1945, 1949, 1954
as a coach: 3
 1963, 1964, 1971

References

External links 
 
 Serie A Statistics

1922 births
1984 deaths
Footballers from Shkodër
Albanian footballers
Association football forwards
Albania international footballers
KF Vllaznia Shkodër players
S.S. Lazio players
FK Partizani Tirana players
KF Spartaku Tiranë players
Serie A players
Albanian expatriate footballers
Expatriate footballers in Italy
Albanian expatriate sportspeople in Italy
Albanian football managers
Albania national football team managers
FK Partizani Tirana managers
KF Teuta Durrës managers